A claw is a sharp growth at the end of a toe or finger.

Claw or Claws may also refer to:

Arts, entertainment, and media

Fictional entities
Claw (comics), several unrelated characters
C.L.A.W., a fictional weapon in  the G.I. Joe universe
Claw the Unconquered, a sword and sorcery character from DC Comics
Doctor Claw, the main villain of the animated television show Inspector Gadget
The Claw, the main villain in the animated series Karate Kommandos

Films
 Claws (film), a 1977 horror film
 The Claw (1927), a movie directed by Sidney Olcott

Games
Claw (computer game), a 1997 computer game from Monolith Productions
 Claw crane,  a type of arcade game known as a merchandiser
 Claw, a name frequently given to Street Fighter character Vega

Music
 "Claw", a song by the British metal band Motörhead from their album Orgasmatron (1986)
 "Claws" (song), a song by English singer Charli XCX
 C-L-A-W-S, Gospel Claws album
Gospel Claws, an indie rock group

Television
 Claws (TV series), a 2017 American TV series  
 "Claws", a 1976 episode of the television show The Bionic Woman
 "Claws", an episode of the American animated television series Johnny Bravo

Other uses in arts, entertainment, and media
 Claw (juggling) a ball juggling trick
 Claws (play), a 1916 play by Sophie Treadwell

Implements
Claw beaker, a type of drinking vessel used in the Dark Ages in Europe
Claw chisel or tool, used for stone carving
Claw hammer, a common carpentry tool

Organizations
 Baltimore Claws, a short-lived American basketball team
 Centre for Land Warfare Studies (CLAWS), India
 Clothing, Laundry and Allied Workers Union of Aotearoa, a trade union in New Zealand
 Comics Literacy Awareness ("CLAw"), a UK literacy charity

Science, technology, and mathematics

Biology and ecology
Chela (organ), a pincerlike organ terminating certain limbs of some arthropods like crabs
Claw, in botany, the narrowed, stalk-like, basal part of a petal, sepal, or bract
 "Claws", the nickname given to the Baryonyx dinosaur find made in a clay pit in Surrey
CLAW hypothesis, a feedback loop between the climate and oceanic ecosystems

Other uses in science, technology, and mathematics
Claw (graph theory), in mathematics a complete bipartite graph 
CLAWS (linguistics), a program that performs part-of-speech tagging
 Claws Mail, a GTK+-based e-mail client and news client for Unix-like systems

See also
Clawful, a fictional character in the Masters of the Universe toy line and the accompanying cartoon series He-Man Masters of the Universe cartoon
Claw of Archimedes, a weapon designed by Archimedes to destroy attacking ships
Klaw (disambiguation)
The Claw (disambiguation)